Jim Pollard (4 June 1926 – February 1987) was an English footballer, who played as a winger in the Football League for Tranmere Rovers. He moved to Wigan Athletic in 1949, where he appeared 95 times in the Lancashire Combination.

References

Tranmere Rovers F.C. players
English Football League players
Wigan Athletic F.C. players
Newport County A.F.C. players
Association football wingers
1926 births
1987 deaths
English footballers
Footballers from Liverpool